In geometry, the icosahedral 120-cell, polyicosahedron, faceted 600-cell or icosaplex is a regular star 4-polytope with Schläfli symbol {3,5,5/2}. It is one of 10 regular Schläfli-Hess polytopes.

It is constructed by 5 icosahedra around each edge in a pentagrammic figure. The vertex figure is a great dodecahedron.

Related polytopes 

It has the same edge arrangement as the 600-cell, grand 120-cell and great 120-cell, and shares its vertices with all other Schläfli–Hess 4-polytopes except the great grand stellated 120-cell (another stellation of the 120-cell).

As a faceted 600-cell, replacing the simplicial cells of the 600-cell with icosahedral pentagonal polytope cells, it could be seen as a four-dimensional analogue of the great dodecahedron, which replaces the triangular faces of the icosahedron with pentagonal faces. Indeed, the icosahedral 120-cell is dual to the small stellated 120-cell, which could be taken as a 4D analogue of the small stellated dodecahedron, dual of the great dodecahedron.

See also 
 List of regular polytopes
 Convex regular 4-polytope
 Kepler-Poinsot solids - regular star polyhedron
 Star polygon - regular star polygons

References 
 Edmund Hess, (1883) Einleitung in die Lehre von der Kugelteilung mit besonderer Berücksichtigung ihrer Anwendung auf die Theorie der Gleichflächigen und der gleicheckigen Polyeder .
H. S. M. Coxeter, Regular Polytopes, 3rd. ed., Dover Publications, 1973. .
 John H. Conway, Heidi Burgiel, Chaim Goodman-Strass, The Symmetries of Things 2008,  (Chapter 26, Regular Star-polytopes, pp. 404–408)

External links 
 Regular polychora 
 Discussion on names
 Reguläre Polytope
 The Regular Star Polychora

4-polytopes